Zebina L. Raymond (August 23, 1804 – January 5, 1872) was a Massachusetts politician who served as a member of the Massachusetts State Senate and as the 6th and 11th Mayor of Cambridge, Massachusetts.

Raymond was born to Asa and Huldah (Rice) Raymond in Shutesbury, Massachusetts on August 23, 1804.
Raymond married Rhoda C. Hildreth on July 5, 1828.

Notes

1804 births
1872 deaths
Mayors of Cambridge, Massachusetts
Massachusetts state senators
Massachusetts city council members
19th-century American politicians
People from Shutesbury, Massachusetts